Alison Camacho (born 1971) née Alison Birch is a Jersey international lawn and indoor bowler.

Bowls career
In 1997 under her maiden name Alison Birch she won triples silver medal at the Atlantic Bowls Championships.

She was selected to represent Jersey at the 2002 Commonwealth Games in the pairs. Twelve years later she competed in the triples and fours at the 2014 Commonwealth Games in Glasgow.

Camacho is a two times British champion after winning the fours titles in 2013 and 2015 at the British Isles Bowls Championships.

References

1976 births
Living people
Jersey female bowls players
Bowls players at the 2002 Commonwealth Games
Bowls players at the 2014 Commonwealth Games